Nicholas McCarthy is a British classical pianist. Born without a right hand, he was the first left-hand-only pianist to graduate from the Royal College of Music in London in its 130-year history.

McCarthy was raised in Tadworth, Surrey. He began his piano studies at 14, and by 17 was accepted into the Junior department at the Guildhall School of Music and Drama, where he won the annual piano prize, on the proviso that he focus on repertoire written specifically for the left hand.  He then enrolled in the keyboard department at the Royal College of Music, becoming its first left-hand-only graduate in 2012.

McCarthy was an original member of the Paraorchestra, an ensemble founded by conductor Charles Hazlewood in 2011, which performed alongside Coldplay during the closing ceremony of the 2012 Summer Paralympics in London in September 2012. He left the Paraorchestra shortly after to pursue several international solo tours.

On 23 September 2013 McCarthy spoke of his experiences at a TED conference held at the Royal Albert Hall. In 2014 he featured as a guest presenter for the BBC Proms televised broadcast.

On 4 November 2015, McCarthy appeared on BBC Radio 4's Front Row programme, during which he discussed the recording of his debut album Solo, which had recently reached Number 4 in the classical music charts.

Arrangements 
 Gershwin Summertime (Porgy and Bess) Arranged for the Left Hand Alone
 Mascagni Intermezzo (Cavalleria Rusticana) Arranged for the Left Hand Alone
Rachmaninov Prelude Op. 23 No. 5 G minor Arranged for the Left Hand Alone

References

External links
 Official website

Living people
English classical pianists
Male classical pianists
Alumni of the Royal College of Music
Classical pianists who played with one arm
21st-century classical pianists
Year of birth missing (living people)
21st-century British male musicians